Una is a Municipal Council City in Una district in the Indian state of Himachal Pradesh. It serves as the headquarters of Una district. There are 11 wards under Municipal Council. Una City is home to the Kila, which is a historical fort and an ancestral home of the descendants of the first guru of the Sikhs, Guru Nanak.

Geography and climate
It has an average elevation of 369 metres (1,210 feet).

Demographics

According to the 2011 Census of India, Una town had a population of 18,722 with 9,851 males and 8,871 females. The literacy rate was 86.21%, higher than the state average of 82.80%. The male literacy and female literacy rates were 88.84 and 83.29% respectively. There were 1,954 children below the age of six years. The sex ratio and child sex ratio of the town stood at 901 and 918 respectively. Hindi and Punjabi are the main spoken languages.

Transport 
Roadways

Una serves as one of the main entry points to the rest of Himachal Pradesh through the borders of Punjab at Nangal-Mehetpur checkpoint. Una is well connected with the rest of the state, Himachal Pradesh and rest of India through National Highway 503 and National Highway 503A.

Railways

Una Himachal Railway Station is well Connected with Chandigarh Junction and Capital Of India "New Delhi" through Express and Mails Trains and some other trains connected it with Ambala Cantt.Junction

Nearest Airport's and Distance

• Gaggal ( Kangra ) Domestic Airport (114 km)

• Chandigarh International Airport ( 127 km )

References

 
Una district